An Austrian Cultural Forum is an agency of the Federal Ministry for European and International Affairs, whose task consists of the cultural and scientific dialogue with artists and scientists of each particular host country. 
A Cultural forum focuses on the specific needs of local users and partners, and works independently on different contents. The international network currently consists of 30 cultural forums.

(Originally established as either a "cultural institute" or a "cultural department of an Austrian embassy", which, in March 2001, were both renamed as "cultural forum")

ACFNY Translation Prize
The first award was in 2009. In 2012 and 2013 the award was "suspended until further notice" due to budgetary constraints. It was revived in 2014 and is now awarded in a two-year cycle.

2009 Jean M. Snook's translation of Gert Jonke's The Distant Sound
2010 David Dollenmayer's translation of Michael Köhlmeier's Idyll With Drowning Dog
2011 Damion Searls' translation of Elfriede Jelinek's Her Not All Her
2015 Tess Lewis's translation of Maja Haderlap's Angel of Oblivion
2017 Adrian Nathan West's translation of Josef Winkler's The Abduction

See also 
 Goethe-Institute – the German pendant

References

External links 
Information about 30 cultural forums

Cultural promotion organizations
Austrian culture